Serena Grandi (born 23 March 1958, in Bologna) is an Italian actress, famous as an icon and sex symbol in Italian cinema of the 1980s and 1990s. Known for her junoesque body and voluptuous measurements, she was considered one of the main pin-up girls of Italy. Some films credited her as Vanessa Steiger. Horror film buffs know her for her two gory opuses, Antropophagus (1980) and Delirium (1987).

Biography
Serena Grandi is the stage name for Serena Faggioli, born in Bologna. She graduated in computer programming and was first employed in a scientific analysis laboratory.  She started her acting career in 1980, playing a supporting role in the comedy film La Compagna di viaggio by Ferdinando Baldi.

In the same year, Grandi played the role of Maggie in the controversial film Antropophagus, directed by Joe D'Amato. This film is well known among horror movie fans for its extreme gore sequences. After several minor roles, she took the title role in Tinto Brass' Miranda, which gave her the status of sex symbol in her native Italy and set the path for her stardom.

Through the 1980s, Grandi made nearly 20 films, mainly appearing in "Commedie sexy all'italiana" and erotic films, but also starring in sword epics such as The Adventures of Hercules and in some horror films. In 1987 Lamberto Bava gave her the role of Gloria in his film Delirium. In 1991 she married the antiquarian Beppe Ercole, 20 years her senior, with whom she had a son Edoardo; the couple divorced in 1998.

In the 1990s, Grandi started to back away from the spotlight; during this time she focused her career on television series.

In 2003-2004 Grandi spent 157 days under house arrest, accused of having sold a few grams of cocaine. The case was later dismissed.

In 2006, Grandi was a candidate in the list of Azione Sociale, a right-leaning party led by Alessandra Mussolini, but she was not elected. The same year she published her first novel, L’amante del federale. In 2008, after a break of ten years, she returned to acting.

In 2017 Grandi competed in Grande Fratello VIP, the Italian adaptation of Celebrity Big Brother.

Filmography

Films

Television

References

External links

 

1958 births
Living people
Actors from Bologna
Italian film actresses
Italian television actresses
Italian stage actresses
Italian female models